Nick James Mileti (born April 22, 1931) is an American author, retired lawyer, former businessman, sports entrepreneur and former sports franchise owner who was, during the 1970s, the owner of the Cleveland Indians, Cleveland Cavaliers, Cleveland Crusaders, the Cleveland Arena, the Coliseum at Richfield and radio station "3WE" WWWE AM/1100 (now WTAM).

Sports franchise ownership career
Born in southeast Cleveland, Mileti put himself through college, graduating from Bowling Green State University (BGSU) in 1953. The BGSU Alumni Center is now named in his honor. He was a member of the Theta Chi fraternity at BGSU. Following his time at BGSU, he earned a J.D. degree from the Ohio State University Moritz College of Law in 1956. After military service he opened a law practice in Lakewood, Ohio and became prosecutor there after befriending the mayor. He became involved in sports after serving as chairman of the Bowling Green alumni association and organizing a BGSU game at the Cleveland Arena. Shortly thereafter he purchased the Arena and its prime tenant, the original Cleveland Barons hockey team. Recognizing that the Arena needed another tenant, he sought an expansion NBA team for Cleveland.

Mileti spearheaded a group that purchased the ownership rights to the Cleveland Cavaliers in 1970 to enter the league as an expansion team, paying a fee of $3.7 million; he eventually sold his twenty percent interest in the team in 1980 for $1.4 million. Another syndicate he headed purchased the Indians in 1972 for $10 million from Vernon Stouffer. His partnership that purchased the Indians included Howard Metzenbaum and Ted Bonda.

Soon after winning the Cavaliers franchise, Mileti realized that Cleveland Arena was nearing the end of its useful life. However, when politicians balked at building a new arena downtown, he bought land in Richfield, halfway between Cleveland and Akron, and built the Richfield Coliseum, at the time the largest arena in the country.

In late 1972, Mileti formed Ohio Communications with veteran radio executive Tom Embrescia, which acquired WKYC AM/1100 and FM/105.7 from NBC, renaming them "3WE" WWWE-AM and "M105" WWWM-FM. Mileti then moved the radio play-by-play rights for the Indians and Cavaliers, as well as pioneering sports talk host Pete Franklin's Sportsline, to WWWE. Already the most powerful AM station in Cleveland, with a 50,000 watt clear channel signal, WWWE quickly turned into a sports radio powerhouse.

In his sports ownership heyday, Mileti was a master of leverage of sorts, owning 51 percent of his enterprises with little of his own money at risk. This practice came back to haunt him not long after he bought the Indians. He only paid for controlling interest with $500,000 of his own money, with the rest secured through loans. The lenders first grew concerned when the construction of the Richfield Coliseum was bogged down by lawsuits and cost overruns.

Despite this, Mileti had ambitious plans for reviving a team that had spent the better part of the last two decades in the bottom half of the American League. One of his first acts as owner was to hire new scouts; Stouffer had made drastic cuts to player development. However, his plans were brought undone when two major partners in his Indians syndicate, Steve O'Neill and Gabe Paul, joined George Steinbrenner's bid to buy the New York Yankees. While Mileti was able to find new investors, it wasn't enough to restore the confidence of his lenders, who believed he was spread too thin. Mileti was forced to name Bonda as the team's executive vice president and chairman. For all intents and purposes, his tenure as owner was over, though Mileti didn't formally sell out his stake to Bonda until 1975.

Mileti also founded and was the principal owner of the short-lived CFL team, the Las Vegas Posse in 1994.

Mileti has become a writer in retirement; to date, he has published three books. He was inducted into the Cavaliers Wall of Honor in 2019.

Publications
 Closet Italians: A Dazzling Collection of Illustrious Italians with Non-Italian Names (2004)
 Beyond Michaelangelo: The Deadly Rivalry between Borromini and Bernini (2005)
 The Unscrupulous: Scams, Cons, Fakes & Frauds that Poison the Fine Arts, (2009) Bordighera Press

Honors
In 2019, Mileti was inducted into the Cavaliers "Wall of Honor", which recognizes prominent figures in team history.

See also
Cleveland Indians managers and ownership

References

External links
Nick Mileti bio on Cleveland Seniors' website Retrieved on December 15, 2007

1931 births
Major League Baseball executives
Major League Baseball owners
Cleveland Cavaliers owners
Cleveland Indians owners
Cleveland Indians executives
Lawyers from Cleveland
Bowling Green State University alumni
Living people
Major League Baseball team presidents
National Basketball Association executives
National Basketball Association owners
American people of Italian descent
Ohio State University Moritz College of Law alumni